The men's 4 × 100 m freestyle relay 34 points event at the 2012 Summer Paralympics took place at the  London Aquatics Centre on 2 September. There were two heats; the teams with the eight fastest times advanced to the final.

Results

Heats
Competed from 11:40.

Heat 1

Heat 2

Final
Competed at 20:25.

 
Q = qualified for final. PR = Paralympic Record. AS = Asian Record.

References
Official London 2012 Paralympics Results: Heats 
Official London 2012 Paralympics Results: Final 

Swimming at the 2012 Summer Paralympics